The fifth series of Geordie Shore, a British television programme based in Newcastle upon Tyne, began airing on 19 February 2013 on MTV. The series concluded on 16 April 2013 after 8 episodes and a special episode counting down the best bits from the series. This series was filmed in Newcastle upon Tyne with the cast visiting various locations around Europe, including Amsterdam, Barcelona, Prague and Tignes. This was the final series to feature cast members Daniel Thomas-Tuck, and Ricci Guarnaccio, who departed the series following the breakdown of his relationship with Vicky Pattison. The series focused heavily on Charlotte finally being honest with Gaz about her feelings towards him, a rift growing between Holly and James following instructions from girlfriend Kate, and the end of Ricci and Vicky's turbulent relationship.

Cast
 Charlotte-Letitia Crosby
 Daniel Thomas-Tuck
 Gary Beadle
 Holly Hagan
 James Tindale
 Ricci Guarnaccio
 Scott Timlin
Sophie Kasaei
 Vicky Pattison

Duration of cast 

 = Cast member is featured in this episode.
 = Cast member voluntarily leaves the house.
 = Cast member is removed from the house.
 = Cast member leaves and returns to the house in the same episode.
 = Cast member returns to the house.
 = Cast member leaves the series.
 = Cast member does not feature in this episode.

Episodes

Ratings

References

2013 British television seasons
Series 05